Gary Wayne Coleman (February 8, 1968 – May 28, 2010) was an American actor and comedian. Coleman was the highest-paid child actor on television throughout the late 1970s and 1980s. He was rated first on a list of VH1's "100 Greatest Kid Stars".

Coleman was best known for playing the role of Arnold Jackson in the sitcom Diff'rent Strokes (1978–1986), which he reprised in numerous other television series such as Hello, Larry (1979), The Facts of Life (1979–1980) and The Fresh Prince of Bel-Air (1996), among others. For playing the role of Arnold, he received several accolades, which include two Young Artist Awards; in 1980 for Outstanding Contribution to Youth Through Entertainment and in 1982 for Best Young Actor in a Comedy Series; and three People's Choice Awards; a consecutive three wins for Favorite Young TV Performer from 1980 to 1983; as well as nominations for two TV Land Awards.

Coleman's stardom resulted in several roles thereafter, including his film debut On the Right Track (1981), the comedies Jimmy the Kid and The Kid with the Broken Halo (both released in 1982), the cult film Dirty Work (1998), the satirical-comedy film An American Carol (2008) and the independent film Midgets vs. Mascots (2009). He was the star of The Gary Coleman Show (1982) where he voiced Andy LeBeau, and he additionally provided the voice of Kevin in the animated show Waynehead (1996–1997). He also starred in the video games The Curse of Monkey Island (1997) and did some voice acting and motion capture for Postal 2 (2003).

Coleman struggled financially in later life; in 1989, he successfully sued his parents and business adviser over misappropriation of his assets, only to declare bankruptcy a decade later. Very few details of Coleman's medical history have been made public, although his battles with issues such as growth deficiency, substance abuse, and depression during his life earned significant media coverage.

Coleman died at Utah Valley Regional Medical Center in Provo, Utah on May 28, 2010, aged 42. He had been admitted two days earlier after falling down the stairs at his home in Santaquin and striking his head, resulting in an epidural hematoma.

Early life 
Gary Wayne Coleman was born in Zion, Illinois, on February 8, 1968. He was adopted by W. G. Coleman, a fork-lift operator, and Edmonia Sue, a nurse practitioner. He underwent two unsuccessful kidney transplants in 1973 and again in 1984, and required dialysis.

Coleman was an avid railroad fan, and he later worked part-time at Denver-area, Tucson-area, and California hobby stores to be around his hobby. Coleman built and maintained miniature railroads in his homes in several states throughout the 1990s. Currently, at least one of Coleman's model railroads is being preserved in Colorado Springs, Colorado. In a 1993 television interview, Coleman said he had twice attempted suicide by overdosing on pills.

Career 
In 1974, Coleman's career began when he appeared in a commercial for Harris Bank. His line (after the announcer said, "You should have a Harris banker") was "You should have a Hubert doll." "Hubert" was a stuffed lion representing the Harris bank logo. The same year, he appeared in an episode of Medical Center. In 1977, Coleman appeared in a pilot for a revival of The Little Rascals as Stymie, which ultimately ended up not getting picked up as a series. His work on the Little Rascals pilot caught the attention of an executive, and in 1978 Coleman was cast as Arnold Jackson in Diff'rent Strokes, playing one of two black brothers from Harlem adopted by a wealthy white widower in Manhattan. After the premiere, Diff'rent Strokes became a hit, and ran for 8 seasons, ending in 1986. 

Coleman received recognition and praise for his work on Diff'rent Strokes; for his role he received five Young Artist Award nominations, of which he won two, and won the People's Choice Awards for Favorite Young TV Performer four years in a row, from 1980 to 1983. At the height of his fame on Diff'rent Strokes, he earned $100,000 per episode, and he became known by his character's catchphrase "What'chu talkin' 'bout, Willis?", uttered skeptically in response to statements by his brother Willis, who was portrayed by Todd Bridges. According to Bridges' autobiography Killing Willis, Coleman was made to work long hours on the set of Diff'rent Strokes despite his age and health problems, which contributed to his being unhappy and separating himself from the rest of the cast. A Biography Channel documentary estimated that Coleman was left with a quarter of the original amount of money he received from his years on Diff'rent Strokes after paying his parents, advisers, lawyers, and taxes. In 1989, Coleman sued his adoptive parents and former business advisor for $3.8 million for misappropriating his trust fund and won a $1.28 million judgment in 1993.

Coleman had appeared on The Jeffersons as Raymond, George Jefferson's nephew, and on Good Times in 1978 as Penny's friend Gary. Along with his work on Diff'rent Strokes, Coleman began working in films, first appearing in the baseball comedy television film The Kid from Left Field in 1979. In that same year, he made a guest appearance on the science-fiction show Buck Rogers in the 25th Century as a time-displaced whiz kid named Hieronymous Fox; a role he would reprise in a later episode in Season 2 of the series (in 1980). In 1981, Coleman made his feature film debut with the comedy On the Right Track, headlining as Lester, a young shoeshine boy who achieves fame for having a talent for gambling on horses. The film was received with mixed reviews, with critics stating that the film rode nearly entirely on Coleman's credibility and presence; however, the film was a commercial success, and his performance was praised. He next starred in Jimmy the Kid (1982). The film was financially successful, but received resoundingly negative reviews, with critic Roger Ebert writing "... movies like this don't really have room for brilliant performances. They're written by formula, cast by computer and directed by the book, and when a little spontaneity creeps in, it seems out of place."

Coleman starred in the television film The Kid with the Broken Halo. The film served as the basis for The Gary Coleman Show in 1982, where Coleman had the lead voice role as Andy LeBeau, an angel in training who comes to earth to help others and gain his wings. Coleman voiced the role of Kevin in the animated show Waynehead, which ran from 1996 to 1997. He also voiced Kenny Falmouth in the video game The Curse of Monkey Island in 1997, which gained him attention, being one of the first few major mainstream actors to appear in a video game. He had ventured into politics, and in the 2003 California recall election he was a candidate for governor. His campaign was sponsored by the free newsweekly East Bay Express as a satirical comment on the recall. After Arnold Schwarzenegger declared his candidacy, Coleman announced that he would vote for Schwarzenegger. Coleman placed 8th in a field of 135 candidates, receiving 14,242 votes.

In 2003, Coleman portrayed a fictional version of himself in the video game Postal 2 (2003). The second game in the Postal franchise, it received a cult following following its release, and brought Coleman much attention. In 2005, Coleman appeared in John Cena's music video for his single "Bad, Bad Man" (from the album You Can't See Me) and played himself as a villain taking Michael Jackson and Madonna hostage. The video was a spoof of 1980s culture, focusing on The A-Team. Coleman's final television role was a voice role in the animated series Robot Chicken. His final film roles were starring as Charles Higgins in the sports comedy film Church Ball (2006), appearing as a slave in the satirical comedy film An American Carol (2008), and appearing as Gary in the comedy film Midgets vs. Mascots (2009).

Personal life 
In 1998, Coleman was charged with assault while working as a security guard. Tracy Fields, a Los Angeles bus driver and fan of Coleman's work on Diff'rent Strokes, approached him in a California mall and requested his autograph, while Coleman was shopping for a bulletproof vest. When Coleman refused to give her an autograph, an argument ensued, and Fields reportedly mocked Coleman's lackluster acting career. Coleman then punched Fields in the face several times in front of witnesses. He was arrested and later testified in court that she threatened him, and he defended himself. "She wouldn't leave me alone. I was getting scared, and she was getting ugly," he said. Coleman pleaded no contest to one count of assault, received a suspended jail sentence, and was ordered to pay Fields' $1,665 hospital bill and to take anger management classes.

In August 1999, Coleman filed for bankruptcy protection. Multiple people, he said, were responsible for his insolvency, "from me, to accountants, to my adoptive parents, to agents, to lawyers, and back to me again". He lost $200,000 on an arcade he named the Gary Coleman Game Parlor, which was located at Fisherman's Village in Marina del Rey, California. Ongoing medical expenses contributed significantly to Coleman's chronic financial problems and compelled him, at times, to resort to unusual fundraising activities. In 1999, he partnered with UGO Networks on an online auction titled "Save Me!". Items included his couch, a "tiny pimp suit" with matching gold Nikes and an autographed ice scraper. Items attracted more than $5,000 in bids. 

In early 2007, he met Shannon Price, 22, on the set of the film Church Ball, where she was working as an extra. Price and Coleman married several months later. On May 1 and 2, 2008, they made a well-publicized appearance on the show Divorce Court to air their differences in an attempt to save their marriage. Nevertheless, they divorced in August 2008, and Coleman was granted an ex parte restraining order against Price to prevent her from living in his home when he was hospitalized after their divorce. According to a court petition later filed by Price, she and Coleman continued to live together in a common-law marriage until his death. However, a judge ultimately ruled against Price after hearing evidence that she carried on affairs with other men during the time she claimed to be with Coleman, and "physically abused Coleman in public, led him around by the hand like a child [and] displayed no physical affection toward him in front of anyone".

In 2007, Coleman was cited for misdemeanor disorderly conduct in Provo, Utah after a "heated discussion" in public with his wife. In 2009, Coleman and his ex-wife were involved in a domestic dispute, after which Price was arrested on suspicion of domestic violence, and both parties were cited for disorderly conduct. In 2009, Coleman underwent heart surgery, details of which were never made public, but he is known to have developed pneumonia postoperatively. In January 2010, Coleman was hospitalized after a seizure in Los Angeles, and in February, he experienced another seizure on the set of The Insider television program.

In 2008, Coleman was involved in a car accident after an altercation at a Payson, Utah, bowling alley, which began when Colt Rushton, age 24, photographed Coleman without his permission. The two men argued, according to witnesses. In the parking lot, Coleman allegedly backed his truck into Rushton, striking his knee and pulling him under the vehicle, before hitting another car. Rushton was treated at a local hospital for minor injuries and released. Coleman later pleaded no contest to charges of disorderly conduct and reckless driving and was fined $100. In 2010, he settled a civil suit related to the incident for an undisclosed amount. Months before his death, in 2010, Coleman was arrested on an outstanding domestic assault warrant in Santaquin, booked into the Utah County Jail, and released the following day.

Death 
On May 26, 2010, Coleman was admitted to Utah Valley Regional Medical Center in Provo, Utah, in critical condition after falling down the stairs at his home in Santaquin and hitting his head, possibly after another seizure, and experiencing an epidural hematoma. According to a hospital spokesman, Coleman was conscious and lucid the next morning, but his condition subsequently worsened. By mid-afternoon on May 27, he was unconscious and on life support. He died at 12:05 pm MDT (18:05 UTC) on May 28, 2010, at age 42. The weekend after Coleman's death, a scheduled funeral was postponed and later canceled due to a dispute regarding the disposition of his estate and remains among Coleman's adoptive parents, former business associate Anna Gray, and Price. Coleman's former manager, Dion Mial, was involved initially but withdrew after Coleman's 1999 will, which named Mial as executor and directed that his wake be "...conducted by those with no financial ties to me and can look each other in the eyes and say they really cared personally for Gary Coleman", turned out to have been superseded by a later one replacing Mial with Gray, and directing "...that there be no funeral service, wake, or other ceremony memorializing my passing".

Questions were raised as to whether Price, who approved discontinuing Coleman's life support, was legally authorized to do so. The controversy was exacerbated by a photograph published on the front page of the tabloid newspaper Globe depicting Price posed next to a comatose, intubated Coleman, under the headline, "It Was Murder!" While Coleman's final will, signed in 2005, named Gray as executor and awarded his entire estate to her, Coleman and Price married in 2007. Although they divorced in 2008, Price claimed in a court petition that she remained Coleman's common-law wife, with the two sharing bank accounts, and the couple presenting themselves publicly as husband and wife until Coleman's death. Her assertion, if validated by the court, would have made her his lawful heir.

In May 2012, Judge James Taylor stated that while Price had indeed lived in Coleman's home after their marriage ended, their relationship at the time of his death failed to meet Utah's standard for a common-law marriage. The hospital later issued a statement confirming that Coleman had completed an advance healthcare directive granting Price permission to make medical decisions on his behalf. An investigation by Santaquin police was closed on October 5, 2010, after the medical examiner ruled Coleman's death accidental, and no evidence of wrongdoing could be demonstrated. The disposition of Coleman's ashes remains unreported. Price said that were she granted disposition, she would have scattered the ashes at the Golden Spike National Historic Site in Utah as a tribute to Coleman's lifelong love of trains.

Legacy 

Coleman is frequently listed as one of the most influential child actors in the world. He was rated first on a list of VH1's "100 Greatest Kid Stars" on television, and was noted by MTV for having an "Undeniable Impact on Pop Culture." Mike Hogan from Vanity Fair wrote on his career, saying "He was unquestionably a superstar, overshadowing them with his radiant charisma and boundless energy, but the kidney condition that enabled him, even as a teen, to play the world's most precocious little brother on TV also complicated his life in ways most of us will never understand." Actress Lucille Ball stated in a 1980 interview with People magazine that although she rarely watched sitcoms, "I love Gary Coleman. He puts me away. He puts everybody away."

Filk music act Ookla the Mok paid tribute to Coleman on their 2003 album "oh okay LA" with the song "A.M. Suicide". He is parodied in Avenue Q, which won the 2004 Tony Award for Best Musical; a fictionalized version of him works as the superintendent of the apartment complex where the musical takes place. In the song "It Sucks to Be Me", he laments his fate. On Broadway, the role was originally performed by Natalie Venetia Belcon. The show's creators, Jeff Marx and Robert Lopez, have said the Coleman character personifies one of Avenue Q central themes: that as children we are told we are "special", but upon entering adulthood, we discover that life is not nearly as easy as we have been led to believe. They added that their original intent was for Coleman himself to play the Gary Coleman role, and he expressed interest in it but did not show up for a meeting scheduled to discuss it. In 2005, Coleman announced his intention to sue the producers of Avenue Q for their depiction of him, although the lawsuit never materialized. At the 2007 New York Comic Con, Coleman said, "I wish there was a lawyer on Earth that would sue them for me."

Following his death in 2010, the casts of the off-Broadway production of Avenue Q in New York City and the Avenue Q National Tour in Dallas dedicated their performances to his memory, and the actors playing the part of Coleman paid tribute to him from the stage at the performances' conclusions. The Coleman character remained in the show after modifications were made to relevant dialogue. Randy Kester—Coleman's attorney—told Dallas News in 2010, "The world's going to be a little less happy place without Gary. For being a small guy, he sure had a big impact on the world." In the 2021 Diff'rent Strokes special, actor Kevin Hart played Coleman's signature character of Arnold Jackson.

Works and accolades 

Throughout his career, Coleman had garnered over sixty acting credits, and over eighty television appearances. For playing the role of Arnold Jackson in the sitcom Diff'rent Strokes (1978–1986), he received several accolades, which include two Young Artist Awards and three People's Choice Awards; the latter being a consecutive three wins for Favorite Young TV Performer from 1980 to 1983; and nominations for two TV Land Awards.

References

External links 

 
 
 Gary Coleman: 1968–2010  photo gallery by The Washington Post

1968 births
2010 deaths
20th-century American comedians
20th-century American male actors
21st-century American comedians
21st-century American male actors
Accidental deaths from falls
Accidental deaths in Utah
Actors with dwarfism
African American adoptees
African-American male actors
African-American male child actors
African-American male comedians
American adoptees
American male child actors
American male comedians
American male film actors
American male television actors
American male voice actors
American people convicted of assault
Comedians from Illinois
Comedians from Utah
Crossroads School alumni
Deaths from epidural hematoma
Kidney transplant recipients
Male actors from Illinois
Male actors from Utah
Neurological disease deaths in Utah
People from Santaquin, Utah
People from Zion, Illinois